Rukhsaar (Urdu:  lit: Cheek/taste) is a Pakistani family drama series, produced by Abdullah Kadwani and Asad Qureshi under their production banner 7th Sky Entertainment. The drama aired weekly on Geo Entertainment every Monday from 9 December 2013. It stars Sumbul Iqbal, Agha Ali, Ushna Shah and Imran Aslam in lead roles.

Cast
Sumbul Iqbal as Rukhsaar
Ushna Shah as Mahrukh
Agha Ali as Amaar
Imran Aslam as Zaheer
Babar Khan as Faizan "Faizi"
Shehryar Zaidi as Rukhsaar's father
Farah Nadeem as Sabia
Sana Khan as Sara
Moomal Khalid as Hira
Saba Faisal as Fahida
Noshaba Javed
Sarah Razi
Mohsin Gillani
Tabbasum Arif as Mahrukh's mother

References

2013 Pakistani television seasons